This is a list of episodes for the anime series Spider Riders. It aired from March 2006 to April 2007.

Series overview

Episodes

Season 1 (2006)

Spider Riders: Resurrected Sun, Season 2 (2006–07)

References

External links
 
 

Spider Rider